SureStop is a bicycle brake technology and manufacturing company. It was founded in 2009 in Palo Alto, California as SlidePad by Brian Riley and Andrew Ouellet.

As of 2021, SureStop is headquartered in Irvine, California with a subsidiary in Shenzhen.

History
Slidepad was started by Riley and Ouellet while students at Cal Poly, San Luis Obispo. Ouellet received inspiration for the product after he crashed his bicycle when applying too much pressure on his front brakes, resulting in front wheel lockup. In 2009, Riley and Ouellet entered their initial design in Cal Poly’s Business Plan competition and won 1st place. In 2013 Alan Nordin, former president of Fallbrook Technologies' bicycle division, joined the company as an executive advisor.

In 2011, Slidepad Technologies formed an agreement with a Taiwanese manufacturer to build a Slidepad braking system for OEM distribution. Jamis Bicycles was the first bike-manufacturer to specify the technology on their 2013 models.  Stanford University and Jamis Bicycles currently use Slidepad technology.

In November 2012, the company took a 40-day, 11,000 mile, "Save Your Teeth Tour" across 90 bike shops from Palo Alto, California to New Jersey.

In 2014 the company rebranded from SlidePad to SureStop.

On April 14th, 2017 was on Season 8 Episode 21 of Shark Tank

Description
SureStop is an Intelligent Brake Distribution (IBD) technology, aimed at making braking easier for novice or casual cyclists, integrates into V-brake systems to provide single-lever braking. It modulates the front brake force in real time, based on the road surface and rider weight position, and avoids front wheel lockup accidents when applying the front brake. It was designed to prevent riders from flipping over their handlebars when applying the front brake. Once the brake pads make contact with the rear wheel, the Slidepad slides forward, which pulls a cable that is connected to the front brakes. Similar to the anti-lock brake system in cars, the mechanism prevents the front wheel from locking, no matter how hard the brake is pressed or how slippery the road conditions are.

References

External links
Slidepad Official Website

2009 establishments in California
Bicycle parts
Companies based in Irvine, California
Manufacturing companies established in 2009
Cycle parts manufacturers
Science and technology in Greater Los Angeles